Terheijden is a village in the Dutch province of North Brabant. It is located in the municipality of Drimmelen, about 6 km north of Breda.

History 
The village was first mentioned in 1332 as van der Heyden, and means "(cultivated) heath land". Terheijden started to develop as the road to Breda deteriorated due to flooding. Around 1400, the hamlets of Hartel and Schimmae were given permission to found a church on the heath.

The tower of the St. Antonius Abt church dates from the 15th century. The choir and transept were built around 1500. The church was renovated by Pierre Cuypers between 1876 and 1878. The church was damaged by fire in 1922, and war in 1944. In 1949, the damage was repaired. The Dutch Reformed church dates from 1809 and is a little white church.

The Kleine Schans is a sconce built in 1830 as a result of the Belgian Revolution. An earlier sconce was built at the site in 1639 by Spanish troops during the Eighty Years' War, but was demolished in 1680.

Terheijden was home to 886 people in 1840. Terheijden was a separate municipality until 1997, when it became part of Drimmelen.

Gallery

References

Municipalities of the Netherlands disestablished in 1997
Populated places in North Brabant
Former municipalities of North Brabant
Drimmelen